Adhesive remover is a substance intended to break down and remove glue and its remnants from surfaces.

Description 
Adhesive removers are intended to break down glue so that it can be removed from surfaces easily. Formulations may be designed to remove a broad range of adhesives or to address a specific bond. Many general purpose removers are intended to remove residue from adhesive tape.

Formulations 
Adhesive removers are often based on organic solvents, which can dissolve or soften many adhesive polymers that do not dissolve in water. They may also contain a gelling agent, increasing viscosity so that the product sticks to the area to be treated rather than running off. Common solvents used include -limonene, aliphatic alkanes, and acetone.

Heptane is also used as an adhesive remover by stamp collectors. Since 1974, the United States Postal Service has issued self-adhesive stamps that some collectors find difficult to separate from envelopes via the traditional method of soaking in water. Heptane-based products like Bestine, as well as limonene-based products, have become popular solvents for removing stamps more easily.

References 

Adhesives
Cleaning products